The Appalachian region has always had to allocate much resources and time into transportation due to the region's notable and unique geography. Mountainous terrain and commonly occurring adverse weather effects such as heavy fog and snowfall made roads hazardous and taxing on the traveling vehicles. Initially, European settlers found gaps in the mountains, among them the Cumberland Gap and the Wilderness Road. Another notable challenge of Appalachian travel is the political elements of constructing transportation routes. Most travel systems are funded by municipalities, but since The Appalachian area has several different states it can be difficult for the various governments to agree on how to work on transportation. The most influential forms of travel in the Appalachian region are based on water trading routes, roads and railroads.

Early roads

Native American trails were the first in Appalachia. One of the earliest used by Europeans was Nemacolin's Path, a trail between the Potomac and the Monongahela River, going from Cumberland, Maryland, to the mouth of Redstone Creek, where Brownsville, Pennsylvania is situated.

The French and Indian War created a need for roads through Appalachia. In 1755, General Edward Braddock of the Coldstream Guards was sent to rout the French from Fort Duquesne along Nemacolin's Path. From Fort Cumberland, Braddock's army cut a military trail through the wilderness. This would become known as Braddock's Road. Another was a British military trail built in 1758 by General John Forbes of England from Chambersburg to Pittsburgh during the French and Indian War, later known as the Pittsburgh Road and the Conestoga Road.

The first modern road to be built through Appalachia was the National Road starting at Cumberland, an early hub of Appalachia, generally following Braddock's Road, heading west first to Wheeling, Virginia. Other roads soon followed such as the Northwestern Turnpike and James River and Kanawha Turnpike.

Water
By 1772, George Washington had identified the Potomac and James rivers as the most promising locations for canals to be built to join with the western rivers. Washington proposed a canal to connect the Potomac River and the Ohio River and founded the Potowmack Company. In 1824, the holdings of the Potowmack Company were ceded to the Chesapeake and Ohio Company. Construction began with a groundbreaking ceremony on July 4, 1828 by President John Quincy Adams. It followed the course of the Potomac River to Cumberland, Maryland. Had it been completed it would have continued west from Cumberland along the Potomac River and then followed the Savage River, crossing the Eastern Continental Divide near present-day Deep Creek Lake, and eventually following the Youghiogheny River to navigable waters.

One important element of water-based transportation in the region is the Potomac. The upper Potomac and its various off-shooting tributaries are commonly used methods of transportation to initiate trade. While the Potomac is known now as more of a tourist attraction, historically, the riverboats of commerce would allow easy supply of shipments, often flour, to local areas across Appalachia. The area's and communities most impacted by the natural body of water would be those near the edge of western Maryland's border, such as Allegany and Garrett county. Another key use of water transportation was moving heavy resource committees such as lumbar down the flow of the current to move resources in an energy-efficient manner. This allows the harvested materials to be moved out of the dense forest without the costly necessities associated with moving them across land. One tool used to assist in water-based movement wood was the pike pole. Appalachian lumber workers use pike poles to control logs floating on a river and they use them to constructing log rafts. Pike poles used in log rafting were originally made of wood, often spruce wood, more modern versions of the tool are almost always made of various metals, however.

The James River and Kanawha Canal was a project first proposed by Washington when he was a young man surveying the mountains of western Virginia. In 1785, the James River Company was formed, with George Washington as honorary president, to build locks around the falls at Richmond. By then, Washington was quite busy since he was elected president in 1789. By 1851 westward progress had stopped due to increasing competition from the railroads.

Even today river systems provide transport through barge traffic on the Ohio River system. The Monongahela River is navigable its entire length, deep into the interior of West Virginia, flowing into Pennsylvania as well, with a series of lock/dams ensuring a  depth.

Rail
The next major transportation leap for Appalachia was the railroad. The Baltimore and Ohio was the first to cross. It was finished to Piedmont, Virginia on July 21, 1851, Fairmont on June 22, 1852, and its terminus at Wheeling on January 1, 1853.

The West Virginia Central and Pittsburg Railway was a notable means of transportation throughout Appalachia. It is a large-scale railway that operated in the late 19th and early 20th centuries. While the four directions the railway went was primarily designed for travel in-between some of the older West Virginian communities (Belington, Huttonsville, Durbin); the track did go to Cumberland, Maryland when traveling north. This means it is a multi-state operating Appalachian travel system like many railroads and highways are today. It is also notable for being a positive economic driver, as the track construction was built privately, with the assistance of several subsidiary companies. 

In 1855 the Norfolk and Western Railway, under the direction of Frederick J. Kimball, began to push across Appalachia. Starting from Big Lick, the lines extended to the Pocahontas coalfields in western Virginia and West Virginia and on north to Columbus and Cincinnati, Ohio.

The Southern Railway linked Charleston, South Carolina, and Memphis, Tennessee, crossing Appalachia in 1857 in the Asheville, North Carolina area, although rail expansion halted with the start of the Civil War.

By 1867 the Chesapeake and Ohio Railway had reached the eastern edge of the mountains and was also reaching for the Ohio valley via the New River and Kanawha valleys of West Virginia. The West Virginia stretch of the C&O was the site of the legendary competition between John Henry and a steam-powered machine; the competition is said to have taken place in a tunnel south of Talcott, West Virginia, near the Greenbrier River. In 1888, the C&O built the Cincinnati Division, from Huntington, West Virginia, down the south bank of the Ohio River in Kentucky and across the river at Cincinnati, connecting with the "Big Four" and other midwestern railroads.

Henry G. Davis started the West Virginia Central and Pittsburgh Railway in 1880. In the ensuing years, it opened a huge swathe of timber and coal territory in northern West Virginia to use. It started in Piedmont, West Virginia, and pushed west creating such towns as Elkins, Davis and Thomas. It pushed east to Cumberland, Maryland, where it connected with traffic from the C&O Canal and the National Road. West from Elkins, Davis created the Coal & Coke Railway to Charleston, completing another crossing. These eventually formed the core of the Western Maryland Railway. The Western Maryland's Connellsville Extension was built west from Cumberland to Connellsville, Pennsylvania, beginning around 1906 and was completed in 1912.

railroad transportation evolved greatly through time. One issue train-based travel had after the forestry boom in parts of Appalachia such as West Virginia was that flooding after rainfall was common as many of the trees and wildlife holding in water were removed for the lumbar industry. The technological progression benefited Appalachian railways however, as advancing tech soon lead to the implementation of crane and lift technology used for lifting heavy materials onto trains for transport. Previously done exhaustively by hand, the use of the lifts made those lift by hand requirements redundant drastically increasing the productivity of the railway based resource harvesting market.

Today the crossing of the Eastern Continental Divide by the West Virginia Central and Pittsburg Railway is abandoned and is used as a Rails to Trails corridor. The other crossings are either part of CSX or the Norfolk Southern Railway and remain the only rail crossings of Appalachia. Cumberland still serves as a major rail hub for Appalachia where two main lines head west.

Highways

In 1880 the Good Roads Movement was formed. They knew outside of cities, roads were dirt or gravel, mud in the winter and dust in the summer. In its early years, the main goal of the movement was education for road building in rural areas between cities, such as Appalachia, to help rural populations gain the social and economic benefits enjoyed by cities where citizens benefitted from railroads, trolleys and paved streets. This eventually led to the auto trail system of highways. The first crossing Appalachia was the Lincoln Highway, which would later become US 30. This was closely followed by the Dixie Highway, first planned in 1914 to connect the US Midwest with the Southern United States, crossing Appalachia following what is now US 25. Other auto trails crossing Appalachia include the Jefferson Davis Highway, Lakes-to-Sea Highway, Lee Highway, and National Old Trails Highway.

The next great leap in transportation was the creation of the U.S. Highway system in 1926, replacing the auto trails. The longest primary US highway contained in Appalachia is US 11 traversing the eastern side. US 21 was another primary US highway, but much of its route has been decommissioned and replaced with Interstate 77. These make/made up the north-south routes. East-west routes include US 30, US 33, US 40, US 50, US 60, and US 70. Many spur routes such as US 220 and US 119 serve various parts of Appalachia.

The Pennsylvania Turnpike was the first long-distance rural controlled-access highway in the United States and also the first one to cross Appalachia. The often ordained "world's first superhighway" and likely the most famous of any Appalachian transportation system is the Pennsylvania Turnpike. It was known as the "tunnel highway" because of the seven mountain tunnels along its Appalachian route. On October 1, 1940, the first section of turnpike opened, running from US 11 near Carlisle (southwest of Harrisburg) west to US 30 at Irwin (east of Pittsburgh). Crossing was completed with the Western Extension, from Irwin to US 22 east of Pittsburgh, opened August 7, 1951. The remainder opened to traffic on December 26, 1951, taking the highway west almost to the Ohio state line. One of the most impressive qualities about the turnpike is just how much land it covers. The unbroken weave of roads goes through several mountains and across many valleys despite having no stop signs and no intersections. Today the road is over 550 miles long, much longer than its original length. Roadways are essential not just for commerce but for the residents of Appalachian to traverse their own communities. 

Many of the smaller roads in Appalachia have funding issues and are in a state of relative disrepair so the PA turnpikes existences promotes reliable long distance transportation for drivers, supporting economic growth and logistical efficiency. It is also a transportation system with use intended for primarily, albeit not exclusively, citizens person transportation needs. Many of the other influential Appalachian travel are based around the movement of trading items such as the aforementioned riverboats. Moreover, the turnpike was also somewhat different in that it connected Appalachia with external areas that were not Washington D.C.

The Pennsylvania Turnpike remained the only superhighway crossing Appalachia until the interstate system that was authorized by the Federal-Aid Highway Act of 1956. Today seven Interstates cross Appalachia east to west, starting with Interstate 86, Interstate 80, Interstate 70, Interstate 64, Interstate 26, and Interstate 40. There are three Interstates crossing north to south: Interstate 75, Interstate 77 and Interstate 81. Interstate 26 in particular is undergoing an extension from Asheville, North Carolina to Kingsport, Tennessee. Among the projects associated with the extension is a future multi-million dollar bridge crossing the French Broad River in Asheville.

However, despite the fact that the region is crisscrossed by many U.S. and Interstate highways, those routes primarily serve cross-country traffic rather than the locals themselves. Towns closer to the major highways and nearer to the many larger cities fringing the region (Pittsburgh, Wheeling, Columbus, Cincinnati, Atlanta, Washington, D.C., etc.) are disproportionately better-off than rural regions in the mountainous interior. Instead of being tied to the land, jobs in the towns tend to emphasize industry and services—important signs of a more diversified economy. Nonetheless, aside from the major urban centers along its perimeter, the entire Appalachian region still suffers from population decline and the loss of younger residents to the cities.

To reverse decline and spur economic growth, Appalachian governors have prioritized the creation of a modern highway system accessible to local residents as the key to economic development. As a result, in 1965, the Appalachian Regional Commission created the Appalachian Development Highway System (ADHS) which was the first highway system designed specifically to service Appalachia. The ADHS was designed to generate economic development in previously isolated areas, supplement the Interstate system, connect Appalachia to the interstate system, and provide access to areas within the region as well as to markets in the rest of the nation.

These routes are known as corridors. They are built to a higher standard than US Highways, but less than Interstate standard, although some such as Corridor E were built to be interstates.

Recreation
The creation in 1936 of the Appalachian Trail, which stretches from Georgia to Maine, helped open the area to hikers and outdoor enthusiasts from all over the world.

References

 “Navigation on the Upper Potomac and Its Tributaries” 
 “The  Mountain State Railroad & Logging Historical Association"
 "Pennsylvania Turnpike Commission’s 75 years"

See also
 Appalachia
 I-73/74 North–South Corridor
 Tennessee Valley Authority